Mesothen albilimbata is a moth of the subfamily Arctiinae. It was described by Paul Dognin in 1912. It is found in Colombia.

References

 Natural History Museum Lepidoptera generic names catalog

Mesothen (moth)
Moths described in 1912